WBIZ (1400 AM) is a radio station broadcasting a sports format. Licensed to Eau Claire, Wisconsin, the station serves the Eau Claire area.  The station is owned by iHeartMedia, Inc.

History
The station signed on in 1947 as WBIZ. The call sign was changed to WEUZ on May 19, 1988.  On April 8, 1991, the station changed back to WBIZ.

In July 2012, WBIZ filed an application for a U.S. Federal Communications Commission (FCC) construction permit to decrease power to 970 watts.

On July 18, 2016, the station flipped from sports talk (largely carrying the Fox Sports Radio network) to classic rock as 98.7 The Brew, adding an FM simulcast at 98.7.

On July 24, 2020, WBIZ returned to sports talk as 98.7 The Fan. The station carries a mix of programming from sister stations KFXN-FM in Minneapolis and WRNW in Milwaukee, with Fox Sports Radio programming during nights and weekends; it also broadcasts local high school sports, the Milwaukee Bucks, and the Minnesota Twins, Vikings, and Wild.

References

External links

FCC application

BIZ
Sports radio stations in the United States
Radio stations established in 1947
1947 establishments in Wisconsin
IHeartMedia radio stations
Fox Sports Radio stations